Hudson Pride Connections Center is a community services center serving the lesbian, gay, bisexual and transgender (LGBT) community, as well as all people living with HIV/AIDS in north eastern New Jersey.

History
The organization was established in 1993 to serve as an advocate for both the LGBT and HIV/AIDS communities in Hudson County, New Jersey.

Community center
Established in 2007, the organization's community center is located in the Journal Square area of Jersey City at 32 Jones Street, in a refurbished three story historic home from the late 19th century.

The community center also houses the Anthony Salandra Memorial Library for LGBT and HIV Resources which feature online access to the catalog, lending access for members, extensive resources including historical archives, first editions, and autographed copies, as well as music archives, DVD and film archives, and a comic book / graphic novel library and the David Bohnett CyberCenter which included a public computer lab, free WiFi access, and computer learning.

The center has also been used to shoot scenes in several film projects including Finding Me and Interrogation Room 109.

See also

 List of LGBT community centers in the United States
 Journal Square

References

External links
 

Social centres in the United States
LGBT community centers in the United States